In mathematics, Brandt matrices are matrices, introduced by , that are related to the number of ideals of given norm in an ideal class of a definite quaternion algebra over the rationals, and that give a representation of the Hecke algebra.

 calculated the traces of the Brandt matrices.

Let O be an order in a quaternion algebra with class number H, and Ii,...,IH invertible left O-ideals representing the classes.  Fix an integer m.  Let ej denote the number of units in the right order of Ij and let Bij denote the number of α in Ij−1Ii with reduced norm N(α) equal to mN(Ii)/N(Ij). The Brandt matrix B(m) is the H×H matrix with entries Bij.  Up to conjugation by a permutation matrix it is independent of the choice of representatives Ij; it is dependent only on the level of the order O.

References

 

Number theory
Matrices